Live In Texas '78 is a 2011 documentary film about the recording of The Rolling Stones 1978 tour of the US in support of that year's Some Girls album.

Track list
All songs are written by Mick Jagger and Keith Richards, except the ones which are noted.
 "Let It Rock" (Chuck Berry)
 "All Down the Line"
 "Honky Tonk Women"
 "Star Star"
 "When the Whip Comes Down"
 "Beast of Burden"
 "Miss You"
 "Just My Imagination" (Norman Whitfield/Barrett Strong)
 "Shattered"
 "Respectable"
 "Far Away Eyes"
 "Love in Vain" - (Robert Johnson)
 "Tumbling Dice"
 "Happy"
 "Sweet Little Sixteen" (Chuck Berry)
 "Brown Sugar"
 "Jumpin' Jack Flash"

External links

The Rolling Stones films
2011 films
Rockumentaries
2011 documentary films
2010s English-language films
2010s British films